Ian Thompson may refer to:

 Ian Thompson (runner) (born 1949), English long-distance runner
 Ian Thompson (high jumper) (1968–1999), Bahamian high jumper
 Ian Thompson (politician) (1935–2009), former member of the Western Australian Legislative Assembly
 Ian Thompson (footballer, born 1958), English footballer
 Ian Thompson (Australian footballer) (born 1949), Australian rules footballer
 Ian Maclaren Thompson (1896–1981), Newfoundland anatomist and medical author

See also
Ian Thomson (disambiguation)